The Coast Is Clear is the fifth studio album by American country music artist Tracy Lawrence. It produced five singles: "How a Cowgirl Says Goodbye", "Better Man, Better Off", "The Coast Is Clear", "One Step Ahead of the Storm" and "While You Sleep". Though the first two singles charted at #2 and #4 on the country chart, respectively, the title track was the first single of Lawrence's career to fall short of the Top Ten.  "While You Sleep" missed the Top 40 entirely, and "One Step Ahead of the Storm" failed to chart at all.  Lawrence did not release another studio album until Lessons Learned, in 2000.

Critical reception
Entertainment Weekly wrote that Lawrence "mixes a fine program of driving, contemporary country with the traditional sound of his Arkansas youth."

Track listing

Personnel
As listed in liner notes.

Tracks 1 - 4, 7 & 10
Flip Anderson - piano, keyboards
Tom Baughman - steel guitar
Mark Casstevens - acoustic guitar, hi-strung guitar
Billy Cochran - fiddle
Butch Davis - electric guitar, slide guitar
Deryl Dodd - background vocals
Paul Franklin - steel guitar
Rob Hajacos - fiddle
Tony Harrell - piano, keyboards
Tracy Lawrence - lead vocals
Terry McMillan - percussion
Liana Manis - background vocals
Eric Nelson - drums
Darryl O'Donnell - acoustic guitar
Dave Pomeroy - bass guitar
Brent Rowan - electric guitar, mandolin
Milton Sledge - drums
Leon Watson - bass guitar
Kristin Wilkinson - string arrangement on "While You Sleep"
Tracks 5, 6, 8 & 9
Bruce C. Bouton - steel guitar
Dennis Burnside - piano, keyboards, Hammond B-3 organ
Mark Casstevens - acoustic guitar
Rob Hajacos - fiddle, "assorted hoedown tools"
Tracy Lawrence - lead vocals
Brent Mason - electric guitar, tic tac bass, gut string guitar
John Wesley Ryles - background vocals
Dennis Wilson - background vocals
Lonnie Wilson - drums, percussion, acoustic guitar
Glenn Worf - bass guitar

Chart performance

References

1997 albums
Atlantic Records albums
Tracy Lawrence albums